The Liuchong River is a tributary of the Wu River in Guizhou Province, China. It is interrupted by the Hongjiadu Dam.

References

 
Rivers of Guizhou